The 1998 Nevada Wolf Pack football team represented the University of Nevada, Reno during the 1998 NCAA Division I-A football season. Nevada competed as a member of the Big West Conference (BWC). The Wolf Pack were led by third–year head coach Jeff Tisdel and played their home games at Mackay Stadium.

Schedule

References

Nevada
Nevada Wolf Pack football seasons
Nevada Wolf Pack football